Norbert from the kindred Rátót (died after 1247) was a Hungarian distinguished nobleman from the gens Rátót, who served as ispán (comes) of Veszprém County from 1246 to 1247.

His kinship relation to the other members of the kindred is unknown; but his brother ("frater") was Reynold, formerly also ispán of the county from 1237 to 1238, whose seal proves his origin from the kindred Rátót.

References

Sources

 
 

Norbert
13th-century Hungarian people